Beyond the Trail is a 1926 American silent Western film directed by Albert Herman and starring Bill Patton, Eric Mayne and Janet Dawn.

Plot
Bill is a klutzy cowpoke who accidentally causes to two thieves to shoot each other.  He is then assigned to bring in Foreman Cal, the thieving foreman.  Bill and Cal fight for the affection of Mary, and Bill is victorious.

Cast
 Bill Patton as Bill 
 Eric Mayne as Ranch Owner 
 Janet Dawn as Mary 
 Sheldon Lewis as Foreman Cal 
 Stuart Holmes as Archibald Van Jones 
 Clara Horton as Clarabell Simpkins 
 James F. Fulton as Buck

References

External links
 

1926 films
1926 Western (genre) films
Films directed by Albert Herman
Chesterfield Pictures films
American black-and-white films
Silent American Western (genre) films
1920s English-language films
1920s American films